The Field Hockey Tournament at the 1999 Pan American Games was held on the pitch of the Kildonan East College near Winnipeg, Manitoba, Canada, from Saturday July 24 to Wednesday August 4. It served as a qualification tournament for the 2000 Summer Olympics in Sydney, Australia.

Men's tournament

Participating nations

Umpires

 Xavier Adell
 Cameron Burke
 Roberto Lopez García
 José Ramirez Gutierrez
 Roger St. Rose
 Marcelo Servetto
 Steve Simpson
 Chris Wilson
 Richard Wisdom

Preliminary round-Robin

Standings

Results

Play-offs

Bronze Medal Game

Gold Medal Game

Final ranking

Awards

Topscorers

Team rosters

Máximo Pellegrino, Andrés Castelli, Mariano Chao (gk), Diego Chiodo (c), Jorge Lombi, Fernando Moresi, Fernando Zylberberg, Ezequiel Paulón, Santiago Capurro, Rodolfo Pérez, Carlos Retegui, Mariano Ronconi (gk), Gabriel Garreta, Tomás MacCormik, Rodrigo Vila, and Matias Vila. Head coach: Marcelo Garraffo.

Robin D'Abreo, Ian Bird, Alan Brahmst, Sean Campbell, Chris Gifford, Andrew Griffiths, Ronnie Jagday, Hari Kant (gk), Bindi Kullar, Mike Mahood (gk), Peter Milkovich (c), Scott Mosher, Ken Pereira, Rick Roberts, Rob Short and Paul Wettlaufer. Head coach: Shiaz Virjee.

Pablo Boetsch (c), Felipe Casanova, Alfredo Gantz, Rodrigo Hernández (gk), Walter Kramer, Sebastian Lüders, Raul Maffei, Cristian Montegu (gk), Luis Montegu, Jorge O'Ryan, Pablo O'Ryan, Sven Schonborn, Alan Stein, Gabriel Thiermann, Alfredo Urner, and Diego Wenz.

Alexander Armas, Eduardo Aroche (gk),
Alain Bardaji, Juan Benavides, Yoandy Blanco, Puro Delgado, Ihosvany Hernández (gk), Ulises Lapera, Rolando Larrinaga, Yumay Oliva, Jorge Perez Hernández, Yuri Perez, Vladimir Reyes, José Rodríguez García, Yunier Rodriguez, and Victorio Valladares (c).

Hugo Aguilera, Miguel Bautista, Enrique Castro, Jaime Eduardo Chávez, Víctor Coleman, Carlos Gónzalez Moreno, Oscar Hernández, Marcos Márquez, Gabriel Martínez (gk), Armando Molina, Hugo Enrique Tagle, Juan Apuleyo Huerta, Jesús López Molina (gk), Mario Antonio Rosales, Carlos Ernesto Morales, and Pablo Sandino Morales. Head coach: Jaime Chávez.

Kwandwane Browne (c), Roger Daniel, Peter Edwards, Glen Francis (gk), David Francois, George Froix, Brian Garcia, Damian Golden, Aldon Jasper, Brian Lee Chow (gk), Albert Marcano, Anthony Marcano, Dean Nieves, Kurt Noriega, Dwain Quan Chan, and Nicholas Wren.

Jang Badhesha, Rinku Bhamber, Randy Christie, Jeremy Cook, Patrick Cota, Steve Danielson, Andrew Duncan (gk), Shawn Hindy, Steve Jennings, Ryan Langford (c), Shawn Nakamura, Gus Reed, Mike Schanafelt, Brian Schledorn, John Voegtli (gk), and Scott Williams. Head coach: Shiv Jagday.

Women's tournament

The competition consisted of two stages; a preliminary round followed by a classification round.

Participating nations

Final ranking

Awards

Topscorers

References
 Field Hockey Canada
 US Field Hockey

Pan American Games
1999
Events at the 1999 Pan American Games
1999 Pan American Games
Pan American Games
1999